Jane Frances Kuka is a Ugandan educator, anti-Female Genital Mutilation (FGM) activist, politician and former Member of Parliament for Kapchorwa in Uganda's sixth parliament (1996 - 2001) and was replaced by Gertrude Kulany. She was the Minister of State for Gender and Development from 1996 to 1998, a State Minister for Disaster Preparedness in 1999 and later appointed Resident District Commissioner for Kapchorwa District in 2007 replacing Tezira Jamwa.

Background and education 
Kuka was born Jane Frances Yasiwa in Sipi, Kapchorwa to Miriam Chelangat in the 1950s. She attended Gamutui Primary School then later in 1966 enrolled at Nyondo Teachers College in Mbale. She qualified as a teacher in 1969. She followed this up at Ggaba Teachers College and became a grade three teacher.

Career

Teaching 
Kuka was a music teacher at Gamutui Primary School in 1969. In 1988, she was promoted to Principal of Kapchorwa Teachers’ College.

Politics 
Kuka unsuccessfully tried to run for Parliament in the 1989 elections as well as the Constituent Assembly elections in 1994. She was later elected as Woman Member of Parliament and represented Kapchorwa in Uganda's sixth parliament.

In addition to being a Member of Parliament, she served as the State Minister for Gender and Community Development (1996 -1998). In 1999, she was transferred and appointed as the State Minister for Disaster Preparedness and Refugees.

In 2007, she was appointed Resident District Commissioner for Kapchorwa district and reappointed to the same position in 2014. In between she worked as the President's deputy principal private secretary

Anti-FGM activism 
As the principal of Kapchorwa Teachers College in 1988, Kuka survived lynching as she was opposed to the resolution of the Kapchorwa District Council that made Female Genital Mutilation (FGM) mandatory. Kuka herself refers to it as "Female Genital Cutting" as she says that the term "Female Genital Mutilation sounds too harsh and fosters too  much defensiveness".

She has been dubbed "Heroine of the Female Genital Mutilation fight" and has spoken on the topic on a number of international platforms.

Personal life 
In 1972, she married Steven Kuka.

Awards and recognition 
In 2012, Kuka received a civilian award - The Distinguished Order of the Nile – Class 4 in recognition of her activism against Female Genital Mutilation

In recognition of her fight against Female Genital Mutilation (FGM), Kuka was awarded the Tumaini Lifetime Achievement award in 2013.

See also 
 Gertrude Kulany
 Female Genital Mutilation (FGM)

References  

Living people
Ugandan activists
Ugandan women activists
Members of the Parliament of Uganda
People from Kapchorwa District
Women government ministers of Uganda
Women members of the Parliament of Uganda
Government ministers of Uganda
Activists against female genital mutilation
Year of birth missing (living people)